The Ali Demi neighborhood is a neighborhood located in Tirana, Albania.

The neighborhood is named after Ali Demi, a World War II hero. The street with the same name is its main artery. The adjacent Mihal Grameno neighborhood is sometimes referred to as part of the broader Ali Demi neighborhood. The neighborhood is one of the oldest in Tirana.

References

Neighbourhoods of Tirana